Pascal Trépanier (born September 4, 1973) is a Canadian former professional ice hockey defenceman who played in the National Hockey League with the Colorado Avalanche, Mighty Ducks of Anaheim and the Nashville Predators. He finished his 18-year career with Krefeld Pinguine of the Deutsche Eishockey Liga in Germany.

Playing career
Undrafted, Trepanier played in the National Hockey League for the Colorado Avalanche, Mighty Ducks of Anaheim, and the Nashville Predators, appearing in 229 regular season games, scoring 12 goals and 22 assists for 34 points, picking up 252 total penalty minutes between 1998 and 2002.

After spending the entire 2003–04 season in the AHL with the Hershey Bears, Trepanier left North America to sign in Germany with Nürnberg Ice Tigers of the Deutsche Eishockey Liga during the 2004 NHL Lockout. Pascal remained in Europe and played in the Swiss NLA with SC Bern the following season before returning to the DEL with Adler Mannheim. Trepanier established himself within the German league as one of the premier offensive defenseman, topscoring for the Eagles defense in three consecutive seasons.

After the 2009–10 campaign, his fourth with Adler Mannheim, Pascal left as a free agent and signed a one-year contract with fellow DEL club, Krefeld Pinguine, on July 27, 2010.

On March 20, 2012, Trepanier announced his retirement after 18 professional seasons.

Personal life
He is married to Playboy Playmate Miss August 1997 Kalin Olson. His uncle Mario Tremblay also played in the NHL with the Montreal Canadiens.

Career statistics

Regular season and playoffs

References

External links
 

1973 births
Adler Mannheim players
Canadian ice hockey defencemen
Colorado Avalanche players
Cornwall Aces players
Dayton Bombers players
EHC Biel players
Hershey Bears players
Hull Olympiques players
Ice hockey people from Quebec
Kalamazoo Wings (1974–2000) players
Krefeld Pinguine players
Living people
Mighty Ducks of Anaheim players
Milwaukee Admirals players
Nashville Predators players
Nürnberg Ice Tigers players
People from Gaspé, Quebec
San Antonio Rampage players
SC Bern players
Sherbrooke Faucons players
Trois-Rivières Draveurs players
Undrafted National Hockey League players
Canadian expatriate ice hockey players in Germany
Canadian expatriate ice hockey players in Switzerland